Villamayor may refer to:

Villamayor in Salamanca, Spain
Villamayor (Teverga) in Asturias, Spain
Villamayor de Calatrava in Ciudad Real, Spain
Villamayor de Campos in Zamora, Spain
Villamayor de Gállego in Zaragoza, Spain
Villamayor de Monjardín in Navarre, Spain
Villamayor de los Montes in Burgos, Spain
Villamayor de Santiago in Ceunca, Spain
Villamayor de Treviño in Burgos, Spain